The Treaty of Montreuil-sur-Mer (finalised 28 July 1274) was an agreement between Edward I of England and Guy, Count of Flanders, providing for free movement of merchants between their territories and effectively abolishing customs charged on English merchants in Flanders. It ended a four-year trade war that had begun on 1 September 1270 when Margaret of Constantinople, Countess of Flanders, impounded the wares of English merchants in Flanders for their king's non-payment of a money fief. The commercial dispute was devastating to the cloth towns of the County of Flanders, which had come to rely on English wool. Under the terms of the treaty a joint committee of four Flemish and four English merchants chaired by two English administrators was established to inquire into the financial losses on either side and report by Easter 1275. Whichever side had suffered the least was to reimburse the difference

References

Further reading
H. Berben, "Une guerre économique au moyen âge: L'embargo sur l'exportation des laines anglaises (1270–1274)", in Etudes d'Histoire dédiées à la mémoire de Henri Pirenne par ses anciens élèves (Brussels, 1937), pp. 1-17.

Treaties of medieval England
13th-century economic history
Montreuil
Commercial treaties
1274 in England
1270s in France
13th century in the county of Flanders